High Lonesome Sound is the seventh studio album from American country music artist Vince Gill. It was released in 1996 on MCA Nashville. It features the singles "High Lonesome Sound," "Worlds Apart," "Pretty Little Adrianna, "A Little More Love" and "You and You Alone." Two versions of the title track are included. The one at the end of the album was recorded in a more bluegrass orchestration, backed by Alison Krauss & Union Station.

Track listing

Personnel 

 Vince Gill – lead vocals, acoustic guitar, electric guitar, gut-string guitar, mandolin
 Steve Nathan – acoustic piano, synthesizers, Hammond B3 organ
 Pete Wasner – acoustic piano, electric piano, Hammond B3 organ
 Steuart Smith – acoustic guitar, electric guitar 
 Billy Joe Walker Jr. – acoustic guitar, electric guitar 
 Jeff White – acoustic guitar (2), harmony vocals (4, 10)
 Dan Tyminski – acoustic guitar (11)
 Ron Block – banjo (2, 11)
 Adam Steffey – mandolin (2, 11)
 John Hughey – steel guitar (2)
 Jerry Douglas – dobro (11)
 Leland Sklar – bass (1-10)
 Barry Bales – bass (11)
 Carlos Vega – drums, percussion
 Jeff Guernsey – fiddle (2, 7, 10)
 Bob Bailey – harmony vocals (1, 6, 9)
 Chris Rodriguez – harmony vocals (1, 6, 9)
 Billy Thomas – harmony vocals (1)
 Alison Krauss – harmony vocals (2, 11), fiddle (11)
 Kim Richey – harmony vocals (4)
 Bekka Bramlett – harmony vocals (5, 6)
 Patty Loveless – harmony vocals (7)
 Shelby Lynne – harmony vocals (8)
 Lisa Bevill – harmony vocals (9)
 Kim Fleming – harmony vocals (9)
 Nicole C. Mullen – harmony vocals (9)

Production 
 Tony Brown – producer
 Chuck Ainlay – recording, mixing 
 Graham Lewis – second engineer
 Denny Purcell – mastering
 Jessie Noble – project coordinator 
 Robert Ascroft – art direction, design 
 Bill Brunt – art direction, design 
 Jim McGuire – photography 
 The Fitzgerald Hartley Co. – management 
 Recorded at Masterfonics and The Tracking Room (Nashville, Tennessee).
 Overdubbed at Emerald Sound Studio (Nashville, Tennessee).
 Mixed at Masterfonics, The Tracking Room and Emerald Sound Studio.
 Mastered at Georgetown Masters (Nashville, Tennessee).

Charts

1996 albums
Vince Gill albums
MCA Records albums
Albums produced by Tony Brown (record producer)